Stuff White People Like (sometimes known by the initialism SWPL) is a blog that takes a satirical aim at the interests of North American "left-leaning, city-dwelling, white people". The blog was created in January 2008 by a white Canadian, Christian Lander, a Los Angeles copywriter who grew up in Toronto and graduated from McGill University in Montreal. Lander co-authored the site with his Filipino Canadian friend Myles Valentin, after Valentin teased Lander for watching the HBO television series The Wire. Lander's blog became popular very quickly, registering over 300,000 daily hits and over 40 million total hits by the end of September 2008.

Summary
Although the blog "has spurred an outpouring from those who view it as offensive and racist", it is not about the interests of all white people, but rather a stereotype of affluent, environmentally and socially conscious, anti-corporate white North Americans, who typically hold a degree in the liberal arts. Lander claims to be lampooning contemporary versions of bohemian/hipster culture, and jokingly refers to other classes and subcultures of white people as "the wrong kind of white people". Despite the site's satirical edge, Lander regards the people he describes with affection and numbers himself among them, describing himself as "a self-aware, left-wing person who's not afraid to recognize the selfishness and contradictions that come on the left". The initialism "SWPL" has been adopted in some circles as a (usually pejorative) shorthand term for the type of people depicted on the blog.

Publication

A book (Stuff White People Like: A Definitive Guide to the Unique Taste of Millions) was released on July 1, 2008. Lander is listed as the sole author of the book, although some of its content comes from the blog posts written by Valentin. The book remained on The New York Times bestseller list for months. Lander was reportedly given a $300,000 advance by Random House, the book's publisher. He released a sequel (Whiter Shades of Pale: The Stuff White People Like, Coast to Coast from Seattle's Sweaters to Maine's Microbrews) on November 23, 2010.

See also
Bobos in Paradise
Portlandia (TV series)
Stereotypes of white Americans
Karen (slang)
Suburbia
White people

References

External links
Stuff White People Like WordPress blog

2008 non-fiction books
American satirical websites
Internet properties established in 2008
Random House books
Stereotypes of urban people
Stereotypes of white Americans
European-Canadian culture
Works about White Americans
1978 births
Living people